Schwanitz is a German surname. Notable people with the surname include:

Christina Schwanitz (born 1985), German shot putter
Wolfgang Schwanitz (born 1930), last head of the Stasi, the East German secret police
Wolfgang G. Schwanitz (born 1955), German-American Middle East historian

German-language surnames